The 2018–19 Bradley Braves men's basketball team represented Bradley University during the 2018–19 NCAA Division I men's basketball season. The Braves, led by fourth-year head coach Brian Wardle, played their home games at Carver Arena in Peoria, Illinois as members of the Missouri Valley Conference. They finished the season 20–15, 9–9 in MVC play to finish in a three-way tie for fifth place. As the No. 5 seed in the MVC tournament, they defeated Missouri State, Loyola, and Northern Iowa to win the tournament championship. As a result, they received the conference's automatic bid to the NCAA tournament as the No. 15 seed in the East region. There they lost to No. 2-seeded Michigan State in the first round.

Previous season
The Braves finished the 2017–18 season 20–13, 9–9 in MVC play to finish in fifth place. They defeated Drake in the first round of the MVC tournament before losing to Loyola–Chicago in the semifinals.

Offseason

Departures

2018 recruiting class

2019 recruiting class

Roster

Schedule and results

|-
! colspan="9" style=| Exhibition

|-
! colspan="9" style=|  Non-conference regular season

|-
!colspan=12 style=| Missouri Valley Conference regular season

|-
!colspan=9 style=| Missouri Valley tournament

|-
!colspan=9 style=| NCAA tournament

Source

References

2018-19
2018–19 Missouri Valley Conference men's basketball season
2018 in sports in Illinois
2019 in sports in Illinois
Bradley